"Bon Voyage" is the first single from the debut studio album Bitte ziehen Sie durch, by the Hamburg hip hop and electropunk band Deichkind, in cooperation with the German rapper Nina Tenge. It was the first single ever by the band.

Videos

Music video
The music video shows Deichkind, Nina, some cheerleaders and some car hydraulics in front of a white background rapping the song.

Lyric video
The lyric video shows the words "Bon Voyage" on a black screen, changing its colours.

Track listing
Digital download – radio edit
"Bon Voyage"  – 3:28

Digital download – extended
"Bon Voyage"  – 5:24

CD single
"Bon Voyage"  – 3:28
"Bon Voyage"  – 5:31
"Evergreens"  – 4:16
"Bon Voyage"  – 3:23

Charts

References

2000 singles
2000 songs